Amchok was a town and Village Development Committee  in Ilam District in the Province No. 1 of eastern Nepal. At the time of the 1991 Nepal census it had a population of 4288 persons living in 755 individual households.

It was supersede by rural municipality in 2017.

References

External links
UN map of the municipalities of Gulmi District

Populated places in Ilam District
Towns in Nepal